Dejan Aćimović (born 20 May 1963) is a Bosnian-Croatian actor and film director.  

He was born in Čapljina, SFR Yugoslavia, now Bosnia and Herzegovina. As an actor, his work included principal and supporting roles in numerous films, both within and outside Croatia. His directorial debut was Je li jasno, prijatelju? (2000), for which he won a Golden Arena Award as a supporting actor during Pula Film Festival.

Filmography

Actor
 Putovanje u Vučjak (1986) (TV)
 Život sa stricem (1988)
 Diploma za smrt (1989)
 Ljeto za sjećanje (1990)
 Čaruga (1991)
 Zlatne godine (1992)
 Vukovar se vraća kući (1994)
 Gornja granica (1995)
 Prolazi sve (1995)
 Olovna pričest (1995) (TV)
 Posebna vožnja (1995) (TV)
 Felix (1996)
 Božić u Beču (1997)
 The Peacemaker (1997)
 Zbogum na dvaesetiot vek (1998)
 Bogorodica (1999)
 Četverored (1999)
 Je li jasno prijatelju? (2000)
 Novo doba (2002) (TV)
 Radio West (2003)
 Remake (2003)
 Konjanik (2003)
 Infekcija (2003)
 Mathilde (2004)
 Crna hronika (2004) (TV)
 Družba Isusova (2004)
 Iluzija (2004)
 Bal-Can-Can (2005)
 Grbavica (2006)
 Duh u močvari (2006)
 Hermano (2007)
 72 Days (2010)
 The Parade (2011)

Director
 Is It Clear, My Friend? (2000)
 I Have to Sleep, My Angel (2007)
 Anka (2017)

Awards
 2000 Pula Film Festival - Golden Arena Award: Best Actor in a Supporting Role (Je li jasno prijatelju?)

References

External links
 
 

1963 births
Living people
Croatian male film actors
People from Čapljina
Yugoslav male film actors
Yugoslav male television actors
Croatian film directors